Global Warming is the seventh studio album recorded by Cuban-American rapper Pitbull. It was released on November 16, 2012 through Mr. 305, Polo Grounds and RCA Records. A teaser for the release was first released onto Pitbull's official Facebook and YouTube channel on September 17, 2012. The production on the album was handled by multiple producers including Afrojack, Sir Nolan, DJ Buddha, Adam Messinger and Nasri. The album also features guest appearances by Christina Aguilera, Usher, Kesha, Chris Brown, Enrique Iglesias, Jennifer Lopez and Shakira among others.

Global Warming was supported by four singles: "Don't Stop the Party", "Get It Started", "Feel This Moment" and  "Back in Time" which was the theme to the 2012 film "Men In Black 3". The album received generally positive reviews from music critics and was a commercial success. It debuted at number 14 on the US Billboard 200, selling 64,000 copies in its first week. It was also certified double platinum by the Recording Industry Association of America (RIAA) in October 2020.

Background
On October 7, 2011, RCA Music Group announced it was disbanding J Records along with Arista Records and Jive Records. With the shutdown, Pitbull, and all other artists previously signed to these three labels, will instead release future material on the RCA Records brand. In April 2012, it was announced that his seventh studio album would be titled Global Warming. Pitbull announced in May 2012, via Facebook, that the album would be released on November 19, 2012. It was also announced that the lead single from the album would be attached to the Men in Black 3 soundtrack. "Back in Time", which samples "Love Is Strange" by Mickey & Sylvia, was released on March 27, 2012. The second single, "Get It Started" featuring singer Shakira, was released in June 2012. A tour promoting the album in the United States began in August 2012, and includes the concert in Ulan Bator, Mongolia on September 8.

In October, Pitbull confirmed that Shakira, Christina Aguilera, Chris Brown, Jennifer Lopez, The Wanted, Enrique Iglesias and Havana Brown would all be featured on the album. The song "Last Night" was originally intended for Paris Hilton, and Nicole Scherzinger had recorded a demo of "Outta Nowhere" in 2012. Complex named the album cover the second worst of 2012. "Feel This Moment" was included in the Emoji Movie score; "Do It" from the Meltdown EP was included in the soundtrack for the movie Step Up: All In.

Singles
The album spawned four singles from its songs. The first single, "Back in Time" was released as the album's lead single on March 27, 2012. The song was released as the main theme from Men in Black 3, appearing over the end credits of the film. The song eventually peaked at number 11 on the US Billboard Hot 100, number 3 in France, number 4 in Canada, number 4 in Australia and number 5 in Germany. The second single, "Get It Started" was released on June 25, 2012. The song features guest vocals from Colombian singer, plus songwriter Shakira. It peaked at number 89 on the US Billboard Hot 100. The third single, "Don't Stop the Party" was released on September 25, 2012. The song contains a sample of the song "Funky Vodka" performed by TJR. The single peaked at number 17 on the US Billboard Hot 100, number seven in the UK and number nine in Canada. The fourth and final single, "Feel This Moment" was released on January 18, 2013. The song features guest vocals from the American recording artist Christina Aguilera. The song features a re-created (not sampled) melody from "Take On Me" performed by A-ha. It eventually peaked at number eight on the US Billboard Hot 100, number one in Spain, number four in Canada, number five in the UK, number six in Australia and number 9 in Germany.

Promotional singles
"Echa Pa'lla (Manos Pa'rriba)" featuring Papayo was released on July 16, 2012 as the album's first promotional single.

"Outta Nowhere" was released as the album's second promotional single on May 28, 2013. The song features Colombian-American recording artist Danny Mercer. The music video was shot and filmed during July 2013, however, Pitbull decided not to release it.

Other songs

"Hope We Meet Again" serves as track 5 to the album and features vocals from Chris Brown thus marking Pitbull and Chris Brown's second collaboration together since International Love.

"Party Ain't Over" serves as track 6 to the album and features vocals from American singer Usher and is produced by Afrojack. This song marks Pitbull and Usher's second collaboration together.

"Drinks For You (Ladies Anthem)" serves as track 7 to the album and features guest vocals from singer Jennifer Lopez and is credited as J.Lo.

"Tchu Tchu Tcha" serves as track 10 to the album which features vocals from singer Enrique Iglesias thus marking their fourth collaboration together.

"I'm Off That" serves as track 12 on the album and is produced by Afrojack who also produced three other songs on the album.

"Echa Pa'lla (Manos Parriba)" serves as track 13 to the deluxe version on the album and features vocals from Papayo. The song also won a latin grammy and is one of the two Pitbull songs (alongside "Don't Stop the Party") in the movie Despicable Me 2.

"Everybody F**ks" serves as track 14 to the deluxe version of the album and features vocals from singer Akon and rapper David Rush.

"11:59" serves as track 16 to the deluxe version of the album which features vocals from singer Vein who recently collaborated with Pitbull on the album Planet Pit appearing on the tracks "Mr. Worldwide (Intro)" and "Took My Love".

"That High" serves as track 14 to Global Warming: Meltdown and features vocals from American singer Kelly Rowland from Destiny's Child. This song marks the second collaboration between Pitbull and Kelly Rowland who recently collaborated with Jamie Drastik for Pitbull's album Planet Pit.

"Do It" serves as track 15 to Global Warming: Meltdown and features vocals from Mayer Hawthorne. The song was also featured in the movie Step Up: All In and also appears on the soundtrack.

"Sun in California" serves as track 16 to Global Warming: Meltdown and features Mohombi and PLAYB4CK.

"All the Things" serves as the 17th and final track to Global Warming: Meltdown which features vocals from Inna and is produced by Scottish DJ Calvin Harris and American rapper Diddy.

Critical reception

At Metacritic, which assigns a normalised rating out of 100 to reviews from mainstream critics, it received an average score of 63, based on 8 reviews indicating "Generally favorable reviews". Ray Rahman of Entertainment Weekly gave the album an A− rating stating that the: "highlight may be the Christina Aguilera collab" while also giving a nod to the Havana Brown collaboration "Last Night" as the other "best track". Sam Lansky of the website Idolator stated the music and large range of featured artists are "mostly what fans of his clubby hip-pop have come to expect, so don't be surprised when it's blasting at your local mall for the next year." He noted Pitbull's collaboration with Jennifer Lopez, "Drinks for You (Ladies Anthem)" to be one of the album's stand-out tracks.

Commercial performance
Global Warming debuted at number 14 on the US Billboard 200, selling 64,000 copies in its first week. The album also debuted at number one on the US Top Rap Albums chart. As of December 2013, the album has sold 355,000 copies in the US. On October 16, 2020, the album was certified double platinum by the Recording Industry Association of America (RIAA) for combined sales and album-equivalent units of over two million units in the United States.

Track listing

Notes
 signifies an additional producer
 signifies a co-producer
 The clean version of "Tchu Tchu Tcha" is used for the explicit version of Global Warming on iTunes.

Sample credits
 "Global Warming" contains a portion of the composition from "Macarena" written by Antonio Monge and Rafael Ruiz.
"Don't Stop the Party" contains a sample from "Funky Kingston" written by Frederick Hibbert, as performed by Toots & The Maytals.
"Feel This Moment" contains a portion of the composition "Take On Me", written by Pål Waaktaar, Morten Harket, and Magne Furuholmen, as performed by A-ha.
"Back in Time" contains a sample from "Love is Strange", written by Mickey Baker, Sylvia Robinson, and Ellas McDaniel, as performed by Mickey & Sylvia.
 "Have Some Fun" contains a portion of the composition "All I Wanna Do", written by David Baerwald, Bill Bottrell, Wyn Cooper, Sheryl Crow, and Kevin Gilbert, as performed by Sheryl Crow.
 "Tchu Tchu Tcha" contains a portion of the composition "Eu Quero Tchu, Eu Quero Tcha", written by Shylton Fernandes, as performed by João Lucas & Marcelo.
 "I'm Off That" contains a sample from "Pacha on Acid", written by Nick van de Wall, as performed by Afrojack.
"Timber" contains a portion of the composition "San Francisco Bay", written by Lee Oskar, Keri Oskar, and Greg Errico; as well as a sample of one of Pitbull's own songs, "11:59" featuring Vein.

Charts

Weekly charts

Year-end charts

Certifications

Release history

References

External links
 

2012 albums
Pitbull (rapper) albums
Spanish-language albums
Albums about climate change